Murderball is a 2005 American documentary film about athletes who are physically disabled who play wheelchair rugby. It centres on the rivalry between the Canadian and U.S. teams leading up to the 2004 Paralympic Games. It was directed by Henry Alex Rubin and Dana Adam Shapiro, and produced by Jeffrey V. Mandel and Shapiro. It was nominated for Best Documentary Feature for the 78th Academy Awards. Murderball was the first and only MTV film released through THINKFilm as well as Participant Media.

UN screening
The film was screened at the United Nations uncut. One of its stars, Mark Zupan, winced when describing how embarrassed he was to have his mother hear his remarks on the sex lives of persons with quadriplegia.

Production
Murderball was shot on a low budget. The main camera used was a Panasonic AG-DVX100; a Sony PD150 was used to shoot some of the early interviews. The crew rigged a Sennheiser shotgun microphone to use as a boom, and relied heavily on Lavaliere wireless microphones as well. Available lighting was used almost exclusively. Additional light was provided using an inexpensive china ball. In one example of on-the-spot lighting, a flashlight was diffused using only a napkin.

Reception
Murderball garnered almost universally positive reviews. On Rotten Tomatoes, it has an approval rating of 98% based on reviews from 140 critics, and an average rating of 8.37/10. This film is also #1 on the Rotten Tomatoes countdown of the top sports movies. Metacritic gives an aggregated score of 87 out of 100, based on 33 critics, indicating "universal acclaim". Murderball also received positive reviews from Hollywood.com and Roger Ebert, who said "This is one of those rare docs, like Hoop Dreams, where life provides a better ending than the filmmakers could have hoped for."

Awards

Musical score and soundtrack

The film score was composed and performed by Jamie Saft and the soundtrack album, which featuring selections from Saft's score along with previously released tracks by Ministry, Ween, The Polyphonic Spree, Sam Prekop, The Moldy Peaches, The Whiles, Chessie and Scratch Massive used in the documentary, was released on the Commotion label in 2005. Additional music composed for the film was released on Saft's A Bag of Shells (Tzadik, 2010).

Allmusic's James Christopher Monger said "Hearing Ministry's Alaine Jourgensen screaming "thieves, thieves & liars, murderers" over the clash of metal on metal during a wheelchair rugby match dutifully amplifies the primal nature of competition, especially when all of the players involved have overcome near-death physical (and psychological) injuries. ... The film's producers have compiled a rousing soundtrack that reflects the sport's brutality while maintaining an undercurrent of regretful stoicism. Keyboard player/composer Jamie Saft provides Murderballs backbone, laying down an original score that boasts atmospherics which are both tender and visceral. Other highlights include the engaging "Something" from the Sea and Cake's Sam Prekop, a trippy instrumental from Ween and the Moldy Peaches "Anyone Else But You."".

 Track listing 
All compositions by Jamie Saft except where noted
 Ministry: "Thieves" (Paul Barker, Al Jourgensen) – 4:59
 Jamie Saft: "Murderball Remix" – 4:44
 Ween: "The F**ked Jam" (Aaron Freeman, Michael Melchiondo) – 2:55
 The Polyphonic Spree: "Light & Day" (Tim DeLaughter) – 3:24	
 Sam Prekop: "Something" (Sam Prekop) – 3:47
 Jamie Saft: "Robert's Theme" – 2:27
 "The Moldy Peaches: "Anyone Else but You" (Kimya Dawson) – 2:57	
 "The Whiles: "Song for Jerry" (The Whiles) – 1:31	
 Chessie: "Follow Me Home" (Chessie) – 6:51	
 Jamie Saft: "Penultimatum" – 3:21	
 Scratch Massive: "Keep on Workin'" (Sebastien Chenut, Maud Geffray) – 5:12	
 Jamie Saft: "Dungeonous Warfare" – 1:27	
 Ministry: "Waiting" (Jourgensen, Mike Scaccia, Max Brody) – 5:04

References

External links
 
 
 
 
 Mark Zupan's Murderball Journal from 2005, at MTV.com

2005 films
2005 documentary films
American sports documentary films
2000s English-language films
Documentary films about sportspeople with disability
Films about the Paralympics
Films about paraplegics or quadriplegics
Films shot in Rhode Island
MTV Films films
Participant (company) films
Paramount Pictures films
Sundance Film Festival award winners
Wheelchair rugby
2000s American films
Films about disability